The Arab Gulf Cup Football Federation (AGCFF) is a regional association football body for eight member countries. It was established in May 2016, and its main competition is the Arabian Gulf Cup.

History
Several preparatory meetings were held in 2015 using the working title Gulf Football Federation. The federation then was founded in 2016 as Arab Gulf Cup Football Federation to reflect the region's oldest competition: the Arabian Gulf Cup. Sheikh Hamad Bin Khalifa Bin Ahmed Al Thani of Qatar was named as the first president.

Member associations

Competitions

The AGCFF plans to run several competitions which covers national and club competitions. The Arabian Gulf Cup will be held every odd year starting in 2017, and a club competition will be held every even year starting in 2020. Also the possibility of a Women's Gulf Cup has been discussed.

Current title holders

Rankings

Men's national teams
Rankings are calculated by FIFA.

Last updated March 28 2020

Women's national teams
Rankings are calculated by FIFA.

Last updated March 28 2020

See also
 West Asian Football Federation (WAFF) (West Asia)
 Arab Beach Soccer Championship
 2019 Neom Beach Soccer Cup
 GCC Champions League
 Arab Nations Cup
 GCC U-23 Championship
 GCC U-19 Championship
 GCC U-17 Championship
 2022 GCC Games

References

External links 
  

Association football sub-confederations in Asia
Association football governing bodies in Asia
Sports organizations established in 2016
Association football governing bodies in the Arab world